Northern Quezon College Incorporated is a college institution in Infanta, Quezon, Philippines.

History

The Northern Quezon College Inc. formerly Northern Quezon Cooperative College (NQCC), Infanta Community College (ICC) started operating during the second semester of 1968–1969 with the initial enrolment of thirty eight (38) students. The management of the school was entrusted to the Division Superintendent of schools with the authority of the former Secretary of Education the Honorable Secretary Juan Manuel.

Then the management of the college was entrusted to a Board of Trustees. Composed of eleven members, the Municipal Mayor, Honorary member, President of the College the incumbent Principal of the Infanta Provincial High School, the division superintendent, as consultant.

The initial courses were:

1.	Two year course in Associate in Arts General Curriculum leading to SB, BSE, and BSEED.
2.	Associate in Commerce, 2 year Curriculum.
3.	Secretarial Science

The classroom of the Infanta Provincial High Schools were used from 4:30 P.M. to 9:00 in the evening. Little by little the Infanta Community College (ICC) acquired office and laboratory equipment and books for the library.

Qualified instructors were hired on a part-time basis from Infanta Provincial High School and other professionals within the community.

The college operated mainly from tuition fees and occasional budgetary support from the Municipality of Infanta.

In 1988, a group of civic professional groups, including the staff of Infanta Community College (ICC) organized themselves and formed the Northern Quezon Cooperative College (NQCC) and took over the management and administration of the Infanta Community College (ICC) through a resolution of the Sangguniang Bayan, introduced by one of the councilors. From the members of the Incorporators, Board of Directors, was elected to run the Cooperative.

Through an intensive membership campaign enrollment grow from fifty (50) to eighty two (82) as 1992. The NQCC management initiated various fund raising campaigns for the purpose of purchasing one (1) hectare site near the National Highway at Barangay Comon, Infanta, Quezon. A seven-room school building was constructed with separate comfort room for boys and girls.

Each classroom is furnished with blackboards, forty (40) chairs and a teacher's table. All classrooms are provided with electric lights and electric fans.

Board of Trustees

As of August 2017, the following is the list of BOT of Northern Quezon College, Inc.

Program Offerings
Senior High School
Academics
Accountancy, Business and Management (ABM) - Tourism, HRM, Accounting, BSBA
Humanities and Social Sciences (HUMSS) Education, Criminology
Science, Technology, Engineering and Mathematics (STEM) - Science, Maritime, Computer Programming, Engineering/Math

Bachelor's degree courses
Four-Year Bachelor of Elementary Education
Four-Year Bachelor of Secondary Education Major in English  Major in Math  Major in Social Studies  Major in Filipino
Four-Year Bachelor of Elementary Education  Major in Early Childhood Education
Four-Year Bachelor of Science in Business Administration Major in Financial Management  Major in Marketing Management  Major in Human Resource Development Management

Graduate studies
Master of Arts in Education  Educational ManagementMaster in Business Administration in Partnership with PCU ManilaDoctor of Education in Partnership with PCU ManilaReferencesSome Content were acquired from the NQCI Website and College profile.'
http://www.listph.com/2015/01/list-of-tesda-accredited-assessment-centers-for-bookkeeping-nc-iii-page-2.html
https://www.scribd.com/doc/247052642/Technical-Education-and-Skills-Development-Authoryt-Advisory-No-10#scribd
http://www.nqci.net/academicsmenu
http://www.nqci.net/about-us

External links
 The Official Website of NQCI

Universities and colleges in Quezon
Private universities and colleges in the Philippines
1988 establishments in the Philippines